Prince of Lies or The Prince of Lies may refer to:

 Hellstorm: Prince of Lies, a short lived comic book series
 Prince of Lies, a single from Scottish music group Cindytalk
 Prince of Lies (novel), book four in The Avatar Series by James Lowder
 The Prince of Lies, a common nickname for Satan
 The Prince of Lies, a nickname for Cyric, a fictional deity in the Forgotten Realms campaign of Dungeons & Dragons
 The Prince of Lies, a vampire in the Buffy the Vampire Slayer universe